Sharon Cozzarin (born 5 October 1956) is a Canadian former sports shooter. She competed in the women's 10 metre air pistol event at the 1992 Summer Olympics.

References

External links
 

1956 births
Living people
Canadian female sport shooters
Olympic shooters of Canada
Shooters at the 1992 Summer Olympics
People from Centre Wellington
Sportspeople from Ontario
Commonwealth Games medallists in shooting
Commonwealth Games silver medallists for Canada
Commonwealth Games bronze medallists for Canada
Pan American Games medalists in shooting
Pan American Games gold medalists for Canada
Shooters at the 1991 Pan American Games
Medalists at the 1991 Pan American Games
Shooters at the 1994 Commonwealth Games
20th-century Canadian women
21st-century Canadian women
Medallists at the 1994 Commonwealth Games